Jack Howieson (born 28 July 1981) is an English former professional rugby league footballer who played in the 2000s and 2010s.

Background
Jack Howieson was born in Hemel Hempstead, Hertfordshire, England.

Playing career
Howieson played for Scotland at the 2008 Rugby League World Cup, he retired from Rugby on 24 April 2013, just 7 months after captaining Sheffield Eagles to their 20-16 Co-Operative Championship Grand Final win over Featherstone Rovers.

References

External links
(archived by web.archive.org) Sheffield Eagles profile
(archived by web.archive.org) RLWC08 profile

1981 births
Living people
English rugby league players
English people of Scottish descent
Rugby league players from Hemel Hempstead
Rugby league props
Scotland national rugby league team players
Sheffield Eagles captains
Sheffield Eagles players